Alison Wright (born 12 July 1976) is an English actress. She is best known for her starring role as Martha Hanson on the FX period spy drama series The Americans (2013–2017), for which she received critical acclaim and earned a Primetime Emmy Award nomination in 2017.

Wright's other notable roles were as Marjorie in the Amazon Prime Video crime drama series Sneaky Pete (2015–2019), as Pauline Jameson in the FX docudrama series Feud (2017), and as Ruth Wardell in the TNT dystopian thriller series Snowpiercer (2020–present). She also appeared in various films, including The Nanny Diaries (2007), The Accountant (2016), and Ask for Jane (2018).

Early life
Wright was born on 12 July 1976, in Sunderland, Tyne and Wear, where she was raised by her adoptive parents. She began dancing and acting at a young age. Wright studied at the prestigious Lee Strasberg Theatre and Film Institute and The Barrow Group in New York City. She worked as a waitress while auditioning for roles.

Career
Wright made her acting debut in the comedy-drama film The Nanny Diaries, which was released in 2007. This was followed by appearances in various short films. She made her stage debut as Molly Bhatt in the comedy play Rafta, Rafta... (2008), followed by a role in the play Marie and Bruce (2011), both at the Acorn Theatre.

In 2013, Wright made her television debut in the FX period spy drama series The Americans. Her performance as Martha Hanson, a lonely FBI secretary who is manipulated into spying for the Russians, earned high critical praise. She was promoted to a series regular for the second season, which premiered in January 2014. In 2017, Wright received a Primetime Emmy Award nomination for Outstanding Guest Actress in a Drama Series for her guest appearance in The Americans fifth season. The series ended after six seasons in 2018.

From 2015 to 2019, Wright starred as Marjorie in the Amazon Prime Video crime drama series Sneaky Pete, for which she garnered positive reviews.

In 2016, Wright starred as Justine in the action thriller film The Accountant and as Virginia Thomas in the HBO political thriller film Confirmation.

In 2017, she starred as Pauline Jameson, the assistant to Robert Aldrich, in the FX docudrama series Feud: Bette and Joan. The series chronicles the rivalry between Hollywood actresses Bette Davis and Joan Crawford during and after the production of What Ever Happened to Baby Jane?. She also made her Broadway debut as Jessie in the play Sweat, which opened at Studio 54.

In 2018, she had a starring role as Ada in the historical drama film Ask for Jane and as Emilia in a stage production of the Shakespearean tragedy play Othello at Delacorte Theater. In 2019, she had a recurring role in the second season of psychological horror anthology series Castle Rock. Wright starred as Valerie, a "kind-hearted local who explores the town’s evil history".

In 2020, Wright began a starring role in the TNT post-apocalyptic dystopian thriller series Snowpiercer (2020–present), which is based on the 2013 film of the same name by Bong Joon-ho. She starred as Ruth Wardell in the series, a hospitality worker aboard the train who helps look after First Class passengers. Also that year, she made a guest appearance as Ms. Roswell, the gatekeeper to Ace Studios, in the Netflix period drama miniseries Hollywood.

Filmography

Film

Television

Theater

Awards and nominations

References

External links
 

1976 births
Living people
People from Sunderland
Actresses from Tyne and Wear
Actors from County Durham
Lee Strasberg Theatre and Film Institute alumni
21st-century English actresses
English film actresses
English television actresses